Iranite (Persian: ایرانیت) is a triclinic lead copper chromate silicate mineral with formula Pb10Cu(CrO4)6(SiO4)2(F,OH)2. It was first described from an occurrence in Iran. It is the copper analogue of hemihedrite (Pb10Zn(CrO4)6(SiO4)2(F,OH)2). 

It occurs as an oxidation product of hydrothermal lead-bearing veins. Associated minerals include dioptase, fornacite, wulfenite, mimetite, cerussite and diaboleite.  It was first described in 1970 for an occurrence in the Sebarz Mine, northeast of Anarak, Iran.

References

Tectosilicates